Leroi Court (born 20 March 1963)  was an Australian Paralympic competitor. He was born in Sydney, New South Wales.  He won a bronze medal in the men's athletics 100 metres T12 event the 1996 Summer Paralympics with a time of 0:11.48.

References

Paralympic bronze medalists for Australia
Living people
Medalists at the 1996 Summer Paralympics
1963 births
Paralympic medalists in athletics (track and field)
Athletes (track and field) at the 1996 Summer Paralympics
Paralympic athletes of Australia
Australian male sprinters